Simone Leigh (born 1967) is an American artist from Chicago who works in New York City in the United States. She works in various media including sculpture, installations, video, performance, and social practice. Leigh has described her work as auto-ethnographic, and her interests include African art and vernacular objects, performance, and feminism. Her work is concerned with the marginalization of women of color and reframes their experience as central to society. Leigh has often said that her work is focused on “Black female subjectivity,” with an interest in complex interplays between various strands of history.

Early life and education 
Simone Leigh was born in 1967 in Chicago, Illinois to Jamaican missionaries. She grew up on Chicago's South Side in a highly segregated neighborhood. Describing her childhood in an interview, Leigh stated "Everyone was black, so I grew up feeling like my blackness didn’t predetermine anything about me. It was very good for my self-esteem. I still feel lucky that I grew up in that crucible."

Leigh attended Earlham College in Richmond, Indiana; she received a BA in Art with a minor in Philosophy in 1990.

Career 
"I came to my artistic practice via the study of philosophy, cultural studies, and a strong interest in African and African American art, which has imbued my object and performance-based work with a concern for the ethnographic, especially the way it records and describes objects."After graduating, Leigh planned to become a social worker. After an internship at the National Museum of African Art and stint at a studio near Charlottesville, Virginia, she embraced art as a career. In 2015 she remarked "I tried not to be an artist for a really long time but at a certain point I realized I was not going to stop doing it."

Leigh combines her training in American ceramics with an interest in African pottery, using African motifs which tend to have modernist characteristics. Though she considers herself to be primarily a sculptor, she recently has been involved in social sculpture, or social practice work that engages the public directly. Her objects often employ materials and forms traditionally associated with African art, and her performance-influenced installations create spaces where historical precedent and self-determination co-mingle. She describes this combination representing "a collapsing of time." Her work has been described as part of a generation's reimagining of ceramics in a cross-disciplinary context. She has given artist lectures in many institutions nationally and internationally, and has taught in the ceramics department of the Rhode Island School of Design.

In October 2020, Leigh was selected to represent the United States at the 2022 Venice Biennale. She is the first black woman to do so. She was awarded a Golden Lion for her work Brick House in the main exhibition.

Works and critical reception

Leigh has exhibited internationally including: MoMA PS1, Walker Art Center, Studio Museum in Harlem, Yerba Buena Center for the Arts, The Hammer Museum, The Kitchen, The Bronx Museum of the Arts,  Tilton Gallery, Contemporary Arts Museum Houston, SculptureCenter, Pérez Art Museum Miami, Kunsthalle Wien in Vienna, L'appartement 22 in Rabat, Morocco, the Andy Warhol Museum in Pittsburgh, and the Association for Visual Arts Gallery in Cape Town, South Africa. Leigh organized an event with a group of women artists, who performed in "Black Women Artists for Black Lives Matter" part of her solo exhibition, The Waiting Room at the New Museum in 2016. Leigh's work was selected among "the most important and relevant work" by curators Jane Panetta and Rujeko Hockley for the 2019 Whitney Biennial.

During her residency at the New Museum, Leigh founded an organization called Black Women Artists for Black Lives Matter (BWAforBLM), a collective formed in direct response to the murder of Philando Castille, and in protest against other similar injustices against black lives.

Simone Leigh is the creator of the Free People's Medical Clinic a social practice project created with Creative Time in 2014. A reenactment of the Black Panther Party's initiative of the same name. The installation was located in a 1914 Bed-Stuy brownstone called the Stuyvesant Mansion, previously owned by notable African-American doctor Josephine English (1920–2011). As an homage to this history, Leigh created a walk-in health center with yoga, nutrition and massage sessions, staffed by volunteers in 19th-century nurse uniforms.

She is the recipient of many awards, including: a Guggenheim Fellowship; the Venice Biennale Golden Lion (2022); The Herb Alpert Award; a Creative Capital grant; a Blade of Grass Fellowship; the Studio Museum in Harlem's Joyce Alexander Wein Artist Prize; the Guggenheim Museum's Hugo Boss Prize; United States Artists fellowship; and a Foundation for Contemporary Arts Grants to Artists award (2018). She was named one of Artsy Editorial's "Most Influential Artists" of 2018. Her work has been written about in many publications, including Art in America, Artforum, Sculpture Magazine, Modern Painters, The New Yorker, The New York Times, Small Axe, and Bomb magazine.

Brick House 
The Brick House sculpture's torso combines the forms of a skirt and a clay house while the sculpture's head is crowned with an afro framed by cornrow braids. This 5,900-pound  bronze bust is of a Black woman with a torso standing 16 feet high and 9 feet in diameter at its base.Brick House is the inaugural commission for the High Line Plinth, a new landmark destination for major public artworks in New York City, and is part of a series of art installations that will rotate every eighteen months and the first space on the High Line dedicated solely to new commissions of contemporary art. The content of Leigh's sculpture directly contrasts the location in which it is sited in New York since it is situated where "glass-and-steel towers shoot up from among older industrial-era brick buildings, and where architectural and human scales are in constant negotiation." In 2020, another original Brick House was permanently installed in another urban location (albeit surrounded by a patch of grass) at the key gateway to the University City campus of University of Pennsylvania (near corner of 34th Street and Woodland Walk adjacent to Penn's School of Design). Brick House is the first piece in Leigh's Anatomy of Architecture collection, an ongoing body of work where the artist combines architectural forms from regions as varied as West Africa and the Southern United States with the human body. Brick House combines a number of different architectural styles: "Batammaliba architecture from Benin and Togo, the teleuk dwellings of the Mousgoum people of Cameroon and Chad, and the restaurant named Mammy's Cupboard located on US Highway 61 south of Natchez, Mississippi."

The Waiting Room
The Waiting Room was exhibited at the New Museum in New York City from June to September 2016. This exhibition honors Esmin Elizabeth Green, who died from blood clots after sitting in a waiting room of a Brooklyn hospital for 24 hours, and provides an alternative vision of health care shaped by female, African-American experience. In an interview with the Guardian, Leigh says "obedience is one of the main threats to black women's health" and "what happened to Green is an example of the lack of empathy people have towards the pain of black women."  The Waiting Room involved public and private care sessions from different traditions of medicine such as herbalism, meditation rooms, movement studios, and other holistic approaches to healthcare.  Outside of museum hours this exhibition became "The Waiting Room Underground" providing free, private workshops outside of the public eye, an homage to the healthcare work of the Black Panthers and the United Order of Tents. Additionally this exhibition featured lectures; workshops on self-defense, home economics, and self-awareness; Taiko drumming lessons for LGBTQ youth, and summer internships with the museum for teens. This work came after and is related to Leigh's previous project Free People's Medical Clinic (2014).

Recognition 
Leigh is a recipient of the Venice Biennale Golden Lion (2022); the Studio Museum in Harlem's Joyce Alexander Wein Artist Prize (2017); John Simon Guggenheim Memorial Foundation Fellowship (2016); Anonymous Was a Woman Award (2016); Herb Alpert Award in the Arts (2016); and A Blade of Grass Fellowship for Socially Engaged Art (2016). Guggenheim Fellowship (2012), Louis Comfort Tiffany Foundation Biennial Award, Creative Capital Grantee, Lower Manhattan Cultural Council's Micheal Richards Award (2012), Joan Mitchell Foundation Grant, Artist-in-Residence The Studio Museum in Harlem (2010–11), NYFA Fellowship, Art Matters Foundation Grant (2009), Foundation for Contemporary Arts Grants to Artists Award (2018), The Hugo Boss Prize (2018) (a $100,000 award facilitated by the Guggenheim Museum that ranks among the world's top art prizes).

Art market 
From 2019 until 2021, Leigh was represented by Hauser & Wirth. She previously worked with Luhring Augustine Gallery (2016–2019) and David Kordansky Gallery (2019).

In 2022, Leigh’s life-size mixed media female head Birmingham (2012) was sold for a record $2.2 million at Sotheby’s in New York.

Exhibitions 
Leigh has staged many solo shows at galleries and museums in the United States and internationally, as well as several solo public art installations. Her solo shows include if you wan fo’ lick old woman pot, you scratch him back (2008), Rush Arts Gallery, New York; You Don’t Know Where Her Mouth Has Been (2012), The Kitchen, New York; Gone South (2014), Atlanta Contemporary Art Center; The Waiting Room (2016), New Museum, New York; Psychic Friends Network (2016), Tate Modern, London; inHarlem: Simone Leigh (2016), Marcus Garvey Park, Studio Museum in Harlem, New York; Loophole of Retreat (2019), Solomon R. Guggenheim Museum, New York; Brick House (2019), High Line, New York; Simone Leigh (2021), Hauser & Wirth, Zurich; and Sovereignty (2022), American pavilion, 59th Venice Biennale.

Leigh has also participated in many group exhibitions, including the Dakar Biennale (2014); Berlin Biennale (2019); Whitney Biennial (2019); Prospect.5 (2021), Prospect New Orleans; and The Milk of Dreams (2022), 59th Venice Biennale.

In January 2022, her solo show Simone Leigh: Trophallaxis, opened at Pérez Art Museum Miami. The exhibition was organized by Jennifer Inacio, the museum's Associate Curator, and it's scheduled to run through 2023.

Notable works in public collections

My Dreams, My Works Must Wait Till After Hell (2011), by Simone Leigh and Chitra Ganesh, Smithsonian American Art Museum, Smithsonian Institution, Washington, D.C.
Trophallaxis (2008-2017), Pérez Art Museum Miami
Dunham (2017), Art Institute of Chicago
Georgia Mae (2017), Solomon R. Guggenheim Museum, New York
Cupboard VII (2018), Whitney Museum, New York
Figure with Skirt (2018), Nelson-Atkins Museum of Art, Kansas City, Missouri
No Face (Crown Heights) (2018), Phillips Collection, Washington, D.C.
No Face (Pannier) (2018), Museum of Fine Arts, Boston
Opuwo (2018), Rhode Island School of Design Museum, Providence
Brick House (2019), University of Pennsylvania, Philadelphia
Corrugated (2019), North Carolina Museum of Art, Raleigh
Cupboard IX (2019), Institute of Contemporary Art, Boston
Stick (2019), Whitney Museum, New York
Loophole of Retreat (2019), Brooklyn Museum, New York
Kasama (2020), Nasher Sculpture Center, Dallas
Sentinel IV (2020), Landmarks, University of Texas at Austin
Village Series (2021), Glenstone, Potomac, Maryland

Bibliography
 Stefan Üner: Black Renaissance. Simone Leigh, Sandra Mujinga und die Biennale 2022, in: stayinart, special edition, Innsbruck 2022, p. 82–89.

References

External links
Artist Profile by the Guggenheim Museum
Interview with CBS This Morning
 Creative Time Summit 2015 | Knowledge as Collective Experience: Simone Leigh on YouTube
Simone Leigh Hugo Boss Prize
Hauser & Wirth Artist Profile
Interview with New York Times (along with Amy Sherald and Lorna Simpson)

1968 births
Living people
Artists from Chicago
Earlham College alumni
American contemporary artists
American people of Jamaican descent
Rhode Island School of Design faculty
20th-century American artists
20th-century American women artists
21st-century American artists
21st-century American women artists
American women academics
20th-century African-American women
20th-century African-American artists
21st-century African-American women
21st-century African-American artists
African-American ceramists